Cheom Ksan is a small town in Preah Vihear Province in northern Cambodia. It is located approximately 10 kilometres from the border with Thailand.

Towns in Cambodia
Populated places in Preah Vihear province